St Mary at the Elms is a Church of England church in Ipswich, England. Historically it was located in the West Ward,Ipswich, but is now in Alexandra Ward, Ipswich.

Description

The church has a Norman south doorway. The nave and north aisle are perpendicular gothic. The north chapel and chancel date from 1883.

It is a high Anglican Church and affiliated to Forward in Faith.  It houses the statue of Our Lady of Ipswich, which is a copy of a statue in Nettuno that was originally in Ipswich

In July 2010 it was damaged by fire.

Organ

The organ is by Hunter and dates from 1912. Details of the organ can be found on the National Pipe Organ Register.

References

Church of England church buildings in Ipswich
Ipswich
Ipswich
Alexandra Ward, Ipswich